Peev or Peyev is a Bulgarian masculine surname, its feminine counterpart is Peeva or Peyeva. It may refer to:

Daniel Peev (born 1984), Bulgarian football player
Georgi Peev (born 1979), Bulgarian footballer
Gerri Peev, Bulgarian-British journalist
Irena Peeva, professor of mathematics at Cornell University
Peicho Peev (1940–2007), Bulgarian chess master
Vela Peeva (1922–1944), Bulgarian activist during World War II
Vinkenti Peev (1873–1941), Bulgarian Catholic priest

Bulgarian-language surnames